Carlos Sánchez García (born 19 January 1978) is a Spanish retired footballer who played as a goalkeeper.

Club career
A graduate of local CD Leganés' youth system, Madrid-born Sánchez signed with La Liga giants Real Madrid in 1999, being first-choice for both its B and C sides. Benefitting from forced absences to Iker Casillas and César Sánchez he appeared once for the first team, a 1–1 away draw against RCD Mallorca on 23 December 2001.

Nothing more than a third-string player for the club, Sánchez would be loaned from 2004 to 2006, spending two seasons in the second division with Polideportivo Ejido and UD Almería, both in Andalusia, where he also featured very rarely.

However, for the 2006–07 campaign, already a free agent, Sánchez joined another team at that level, CD Castellón, and was an undisputed starter in his second year as they finished fifth. He was also awarded the Ricardo Zamora Trophy for the category, after only 27 goals conceded in 33 games.

In the summer of 2010, following Castellón's relegation, 32-year-old Carlos returned to the Community of Madrid, signing with amateurs CD Puerta Bonita. After retiring, he worked as a goalkeeper coach at CD Leganés.

References

External links

1978 births
Living people
Footballers from Madrid
Spanish footballers
Association football goalkeepers
La Liga players
Segunda División players
Segunda División B players
Tercera División players
CD Leganés B players
Real Madrid C footballers
Real Madrid Castilla footballers
Real Madrid CF players
Polideportivo Ejido footballers
UD Almería players
CD Castellón footballers